Staunton River High School is one of the three high schools in Bedford County, Virginia, opened in the Fall of 1963. The Principal is Mrs. Darcy Parker, with two assistant principals (Mrs. Dooley and Mr. Hetherington).

Characteristics
SRHS is a campus style school with four academic buildings, a gymnasium, auditorium, agricultural and engineering/technical building, library, field house and cafeteria. The gymnasium was expanded and was opened the Fall of 2009.

Location
SRHS is located on Virginia State Route 24 in Moneta, Virginia. The school is located approximately 19 miles East of Roanoke, Virginia, and approximately 12 miles southwest of Bedford, Virginia. SRHS is approximately 10 miles northwest of Smith Mountain Lake and serves the residents on the Bedford County shore of the lake.

Faculty and Staff
SRHS has 3 administrators and the teaching staff consists of 77 teachers.

Controversies and Threats 
On August 20th, 2019, a student posted his intention to "shoot up the school," originally posted to Facebook and Snapchat. This was quickly met with parents reposting the message on personal Facebook pages, leading to a swift response by the Bedford County Police Department, detaining the suspect before he attended the school that morning. Former principal Dr. Josh Cornett is quoted on record as having said on the matter, 

"I want to inform you that a post was issued on social media last night stating a possible threat at SRHS. We have been closely working with the Bedford County Sherrif's Office since learning of this threat to investigate all concerns. I want to ensure you we are confident that our campus is safe and will continue to put student safety as our top priority. Also, we always appreciate our community being vigilant. Please don't hesitate to let the school and Sheriff's Office know if you learn of any additional information. We are looking forward to a smooth Tuesday with the dedicated help of our law enforcement team."

Extracurriculars and Sports 
Staunton River High School boasts multiple competitive extracurriculars including a:

Gridiron High School Football Team

Soccer Team

Male and Female Basketball teams

State Band and Marching Bands

State Choir

VHSL and NAQT Academic Trivia Team 

Wrestling Team

In 2021 and 2022, the Wrestling, Girls Basketball Team, and NAQT Trivia Team reached multiple championships or playoffs in their respective mediums.

Also in 2021, the Theatre department went to, and placed second in, A State Theatre  Competition

In 1998, the Football team won a VHSL regional championship, their only regional title in school history.

Notable Graduates

Charles Buddy Bolding(1967) - Top winning D1 college baseball coaches in U.S. 
Jarret Ferguson(1997) - FB at Virginia Tech and Director of Strength and Conditioning at Virginia Tech.
Ronnie Labrie(2004) - drafted by the Washington Nationals in 2008

External links
Staunton River High School

Public high schools in Virginia
Schools in Bedford County, Virginia